Madeleine Coudray (born 1907 in Ruffec, Charente; died 1978 in Orléans) is a French crime writer. Her writing gained attention beginning in the 1960s. She received the 1978 Grand Prix de Littérature Policière award.

References 

French crime fiction writers
People from Charente
1907 births
1978 deaths
20th-century French women writers
Women mystery writers
20th-century French novelists